The Tuntanain Communal Reserve is a protected area in Peru located in the Amazonas Region. It was created in August 2007 by decree of President Alan García. In 2006, PerúPetro granted Hocol, a French oil concern, the right to drill in territories now partially coextensive with the Reserve.

See also 
 Natural and Cultural Peruvian Heritage

References

External links 
  INRENA/SINANPE website

Geography of Amazonas Region
Communal reserves of Peru